The 2019–20 BBL-Pokal was the 53rd season of the BBL-Pokal, the domestic cup competition of the Basketball Bundesliga (BBL).

Participants
The sixteen highest placed teams from the 2018–19 Basketball Bundesliga, without the relegated teams and promoted teams, qualified for the tournament.

Standings

Round and draw dates

Round of 16
The games were played between 28 September and 14 October 2019.

Quarterfinals
The games were played 14 and 15 December 2019.

Semifinals
The draw was held on 15 December 2019. The matches were played on 12 January 2020.

Final
The final was played on 16 February 2020.

See also
2019–20 Basketball Bundesliga

References

External links
Official website 

BBL-Pokal seasons
BBL-Pokal